Robert Bartczak (born 12 March 1996) is a Polish footballer who plays as a midfielder for German club FC Blaubeuren.

Club career

References

External links

Living people
1996 births
Polish footballers
Poland youth international footballers
Ekstraklasa players
I liga players
II liga players
III liga players
Legia Warsaw II players
Legia Warsaw players
Zagłębie Sosnowiec players
Wigry Suwałki players
People from Włocławek
Sportspeople from Kuyavian-Pomeranian Voivodeship
Association football midfielders
Expatriate footballers in Germany
Polish expatriate sportspeople in Germany
Polish expatriate footballers